The Japan national under-20 rugby union team is Japan's junior national team in rugby union.

Japan won the IRB Junior World Rugby Trophy in 2014, beating Tonga in the final 35–10. This qualified them for the 2015 IRB Junior World Championship in Italy. The team also competed at the Oceania U20 Championship in 2015.

Current squad
Squad to 2014 IRB Junior World Rugby Trophy.

Management
 Keisuke Sawaki - Head Coach
 Shingo Mishima - Team Manager
 Saturo Endo - Assistant Coach
 Takayuki Kawasaki - Team Doctor
 Satoshi Tashiro - Trainer
 Yusuke Sakai - Strength & Conditioning
 Hideaki Noguchi - Performance Analyst

2012 Junior World Rugby Trophy

Pool
  39 - 36 
  38 - 35 
  36 - 29

Final
  37-33

See also

References

External links
 Japan RFU Official Site (English)

National under-20 rugby union teams
2008 establishments in Japan
Rugby clubs established in 2008
Rugby union